John Henry Newman Catholic College (JHNCC), formerly Archbishop Grimshaw School, is an English secondary school in the Fordbridge area of Solihull, although it lies in the Metropolitan Borough of Solihull.

History
It was formerly called Archbishop Grimshaw before 2011, when the school converted to academy status and the name of the school was changed to the John Henry Newman Catholic College.
With an Ofsted report of outstanding in 2012/2013.

References

Secondary schools in Solihull
Catholic secondary schools in the Archdiocese of Birmingham
Academies in Solihull